Charles Wesley Moore (December 1, 1884 – July 29, 1970) was a professional baseball infielder who played briefly in Major League Baseball in 1912, appearing in five games for the Chicago Cubs. Moore played in the minor leagues during 1906–1915 and 1919; he later was a minor-league manager.

External links

1884 births
1970 deaths
Major League Baseball infielders
Chicago Cubs players
Baseball players from Indiana
Atlanta Crackers managers
Minor league baseball managers
Portland Beavers players
Los Angeles Angels (minor league) players
Aberdeen Harbor Grays players
Grays Harbor Grays players
Montesano Farmers players